Bab Saadoun is one of the gates of the medina of Tunis, the capital of Tunisia. 

First constructed circa 1350 on the edge of the suburb of Bab Souika, it originally had only one narrow arch and it was replaced in 1881 (at the same time as the arch at Bab el Khadra) by a gate with three arches, better adapted to the volume of traffic.

Controlling the routes to Béja, Bizerte and El Kef, it owes its name to the saint Sidi Bou Saadoun.

See also
Bab el Khadra

Saadoun
Infrastructure completed in 1881